Operation Cobra was a 1944 World War II battle in Normandy.

Operation Cobra may also refer to:
 Operation Cobra (Timor), an Australian 1944 military operation in Timor
 Inferno (1997 film) or Operation Cobra, an American/Indian film
 Operation Cobra (web series), a 2019 Indian web series starring Gautam Gulati
 "Operation Cobra", a campaign in Company of Heroes

See also
 Operation Cobra Sweep and Operation Cobra Strike, coalition military operations of the Iraq War